Ari-Juhani Hjelm (born 24 February 1962) is a Finnish football coach and former player. He was the head coach of home-town club Tampere United in Finland's Veikkausliiga.

A forward, Hjelm played in the Bundesliga for Stuttgarter Kickers in the 1988–89 season. He also played in the 2. Bundesliga for Kickers (1989–90) and FC St. Pauli (1992–94). In Finland, Hjelm represented FC Ilves (1981–88 and 1990–94) and HJK Helsinki (1995–96).

Hjelm earned 100 caps for the Finland national team. He held the record for most caps for Finland a decade, before being overtaken by Jari Litmanen in 2006. He is also the fifth highest scorer for Finland with 20 goals. Hjelm is an honorary captain of the Finnish national team.

His son Jonne Hjelm is a player for FC Ilves.

Honours

As player
 Veikkausliiga: 1983
 Finnish Cup: 1990, 1996
 Finnish Footballer of the Year: 1987
UEFA awards 100 caps: 2011
 Honorary captain of the Finland national team

As coach
 Veikkausliiga: 2001, 2006, 2007
 Finnish Cup: 2007
 Finnish League Cup: 2009

See also
 List of men's footballers with 100 or more international caps

References

External links
 

1962 births
Living people
Finnish footballers
Association football forwards
FIFA Century Club
Finland international footballers
Mestaruussarja players
Bundesliga players
2. Bundesliga players
FC Ilves players
Stuttgarter Kickers players
FC St. Pauli players
Helsingin Jalkapalloklubi players
Finnish football managers
Footballers from Tampere
Tampere United managers
Finnish expatriate footballers
Finnish expatriate sportspeople in Germany
Expatriate footballers in Germany